Karbas Saray-e Sofla (also Romanized as Karbās Sarāy-e Soflá; also known as Karbās Sarā-ye Pā’īn) is a village in Rahimabad Rural District, Rahimabad District, Rudsar County, Gilan Province, Iran. At the 2006 census, its population was 409, in 95 families.

References 

Populated places in Rudsar County